KYVA (1230 AM) is a radio station licensed to Gallup, New Mexico, United States, broadcasting an oldies music format in AM stereo. The station is currently owned by Millennium Media. The station broadcasts Major League Baseball games as a member of the Los Angeles Dodgers Radio Network.

History
KYVA was first licensed on October 23, 1949. The station was assigned the call letters KTHR on June 17, 1999.  On March 1, 2004, the station changed its call sign back to KYVA.

References

External links
 Official Website
 

YVA
Oldies radio stations in the United States
Radio stations established in 1949